Roberto Corradi (born 29 January 1975) is an Italian former footballer who played as a midfielder.

See also
Football in Italy
List of football clubs in Italy

References

External links
 Roberto Corradi's profile on San Marino Calcio's official website

1975 births
Italian footballers
Living people
A.S.D. Victor San Marino players

Association football midfielders